Saltash Bells is a solo album by the English saxophonist John Surman, recorded in 2009 and released on the ECM label in 2012. After winning the Jazz FM Awards 2013 for Album of the Year, it was announced in May 2013 that the record has also won the Parliamentary Jazz Awards for Jazz Album of the Year by pointing out that on this "extraordinary solo recording" Surman's "beautiful blend of reeds and electronics summons the mists, moors and mysteries in hauntingly evocative style".

Track listing
All compositions by John Surman
 "Whistman's Wood" - 6:32   
 "Glass Flower" - 3:13   
 "On Staddon Heights" - 7:32   
 "Triadichorum" - 3:36   
 "Winter Elegy" - 8:17   
 "Ælfwin" - 2:17   
 "Saltash Bells" - 10:40   
 "Dark Reflections" - 3:27   
 "The Crooked Inn" - 2:41   
 "Sailing Westwards" - 10:37   
Recorded at Rainbow Studio in Oslo, Norway in June 2009

References

External links 
 

John Surman albums
2012 albums